Lena Rivers may refer to:

The Lena River
Lena Rivers (book), a novel by Mary Jane Holmes
Lena Rivers (1910 film), an adaptation by the Thanhouser Company
Lena Rivers (1914 Cosmos film), an adaptation by the Cosmos Film Corp (*Beulah Poynter)
Lena Rivers (1914 Whitman film), an adaptation by Whitman Features, released by Blinkhorn Photoplays Corp (*Violet Horner)
Lena Rivers (1925 film), an adaptation by Chord Pictures
Lena Rivers (1932 film), an adaptation by the Quadruple Film Corp